The Jewish Herald-Voice is a weekly community newspaper serving the Jewish community of Houston and the Texas Gulf Coast for more than 100 years.

The newspaper is the longest-running Jewish paper in the Southwest. Commonly known as the JHV or The Herald, the newspaper has a readership of more than 40,000.

The JHV publishes 52 weekly editions a year, 10 special sections and five magazines, including Passover, Rosh Hashanah, Bar/Bat mitzvah Planner, Weddings to Remember and VOICES in Houston. The JHV also has a website and e-edition, as well as social media pages on Facebook, Twitter and YouTube.

The Jewish Herald-Voice is run by the Samuels family. Jeanne Samuels is the publisher. Vicki Samuels Levy is the president and Matt Samuels is the chief of operations.

History

The Jewish Herald-Voice was established in 1908 by Edgar Goldberg, later purchased by David White and purchased by its current publishers, the Samuels family, in 1973.

Joseph Samuels (December 10, 1915 – January 19, 2011) served as the paper's publisher after he and his wife Jeanne (née Franklin) acquired the publication in 1973.

On April 1, 2008, the newspaper celebrated the 100th anniversary. The celebration included a revisit to older issues and a remark from Congressman Gene Green in the Congressional Record.

Upon the passing of Joseph Samuels in 2011, Jeanne took the helm of the newspaper in publishing and editing. On March 14, 2011, the 82nd Texas Legislature honored Joe's life and dedication to the Texas Jewish community in passing House Resolution 485 by Rep. Sarah Davis, Sen. Borris Miles, and Rep. Scott Hochberg.

There are currently four generations of the Samuels family representing the newspaper: Jeanne Samuels, daughter Vicki Samuels Duke Levy, grandson Matt Samuels and great grandchild Cameron Samuels, who is a contributing writer/photographer.

Awards
The JHV has received more than 100 awards over the decades from the American Jewish Press Association, Texas Press Association and Texas Gulf Coast Press Association for its writing, photography, design and website. For judging during the 2020 calendar year, the JHV won 18 awards in more than eight categories.

Other Notes
Last updated in 1992, the New York Public Library has held microfilm copies of the newspaper dating back to 1938 during World War II. Since then, the University of Texas at Austin, the University of California at Los Angeles, Houston Public Library, and Texas Newspaper Project have also been holding original copies and microfilm of the newspaper dating back to World War II.

In 2001, a group of volunteers from the Greater Houston Jewish Genealogical Society began indexing all "life-cycle information" — announcements of births, engagements, marriages, deaths, and burials — for use in historical and genealogical projects. As of August, 2011, the index database included all events from the beginning of the paper's publication through June 2011.

The front page of the newspaper was redesigned in 2018 to feature a larger cover photo rather than the traditional newspaper layout of story previews. The company has taken many other steps in modernization, including offering text-to-speech on their website and publishing articles on Apple News.

See also
 History of the Jews in Houston

Notes

External links
Jewish Herald-Voice website

1908 establishments in Texas
Jews and Judaism in Texas
Jews and Judaism in Galveston, Texas
Jewish newspapers published in the United States
Newspapers published in Houston
Publications established in 1908
Weekly newspapers published in Texas